"Had Enough" is a song by American rapper and singer Don Toliver featuring fellow American rappers Quavo and Offset of the trio Migos. It was released alongside the compilation album JackBoys (2019) as the second single off the project through Cactus Jack Records, Atlantic Records, We Run It Entertainment, and Epic Records  on December 27, 2019. The song also served as the third single of Toliver's debut studio album, Heaven or Hell (2020). It was produced by TM88 and El Michels, with co-production by Mike Dean and additional production by Cash Passion. It was written by artists alongside the producers . The song samples the track "Summer" off the collaborative studio album Everything Is Love by The Carters.

Background and release
Following the success of the Don Toliver's "No Idea" via the popularity it gained through the video sharing app TikTok in late 2019, an unfinished version of "Had Enough", which leaked in May of that year, began to receive attention and was speculated to be a part of the JackBoys compilation album and his forthcoming debut studio album at the time, Heaven or Hell. The song was then officially released on December 27 as a standalone single and as a track off the Cactus Jack Records compilation project JackBoys.

Lyrics
Offset's verse in the song references his relationship with American rapper Cardi B and the strain that relationship endured during his infidelity scandal in 2018.

Commercial performance
The song is Toliver's second highest-charting single on the Billboard Hot 100, where it peaked at number 52 following the release of the JackBoys compilation project. It also reached number 23 on the Billboard Hot R&B/Hip-Hop Songs chart. Internationally, the song peaked at number 42 in Canada, number 44 in Switzerland, number 60 in the United Kingdom, and number 14 on Sweden's Heatseekers chart.

Charts

Certifications

References

External links
 

2019 singles
2019 songs
Atlantic Records singles
Cactus Jack Records singles
Epic Records singles
Don Toliver songs
Quavo songs
Offset (rapper) songs
Songs written by Don Toliver
Songs written by Quavo
Songs written by Offset (rapper)
Songs written by TM88
Songs written by Mike Dean (record producer)
Song recordings produced by Mike Dean (record producer)